Pristimantis baiotis is a species of frog in the family Strabomantidae. It is endemic to the Cordillera Occidental, Colombia, and only known from the region of its type locality, Las Orquideas in Antioquia.
Its natural habitats are premontane and cloud forests. It is usually found at medium–low heights above the ground on vegetation, inside the forest or at the forest edge. The known distribution is in the Las Orquídeas National Natural Park, and there are no threats to its habitat.

References

baiotis
Amphibians of the Andes
Amphibians of Colombia
Endemic fauna of Colombia
Amphibians described in 1998
Taxonomy articles created by Polbot
Fauna of the northwestern Andean montane forests